Christopher Pike (born 19 October 1961) is a Welsh former professional footballer.  His clubs included Fulham, Cardiff City and Gillingham. He made over 250 Football League appearances.

Career
Pike began his career playing in the Cardiff Combination League with Park Lawn Football Club of Whitchurch, before moving up to the Welsh Football League with Maesteg Park and Barry Town. In 1985, he was given a chance in the Football League when he was signed by Fulham, managing to make an impact on the first team before an injury meant he lost his place in the side and, after finding himself unable to force his way back into the squad, was loaned out to his hometown side Cardiff City. He enjoyed a fairly successful spell at Cardiff but an injury crisis at Fulham saw him recalled.

In 1989, he returned to Cardiff City, this time on a permanent basis. At the club he established a striking partnership with Carl Dale and the two competed for the club's top scorer award at the club for several years, with Pike winning the award for three consecutive seasons between 1989 and 1992, the third season sharing it with Dale. He left the club in 1993 having played over 150 League games for the Bluebirds, to sign for Hereford United.

While playing for Hereford United in 1993 he scored a hat-trick against Colchester United, in which each of the three goals was scored past a different goalkeeper. He made 38 League appearances for Hereford and transferred to Gillingham in 1994-95, where he made his remaining 27 Football League appearances.

Personal life
He is the uncle of Welsh international footballer Gareth Bale and the father of cricketer Oliver Pike.

References
Specific

General

1961 births
Living people
Welsh footballers
English Football League players
Barry Town United F.C. players
Fulham F.C. players
Cardiff City F.C. players
Hereford United F.C. players
Gillingham F.C. players
Footballers from Cardiff
Bridgend Town A.F.C. players
Rhayader Town F.C. players
Association football forwards
Sportspeople from Maesteg